Unlimited is the fifth studio album by American country music artist Reba McEntire, released on June 14, 1982. It featured her first number one hits "Can't Even Get The Blues" and "You're the First Time I've Thought About Leaving". It was one of her first Mercury albums to be released on CD in 1990, but like most of her early material, it is now only available as a digital download.

Track listing

Personnel
Vocals

 Reba McEntire – lead and backing vocals
 Yvonne Hodges – backing vocals
 Susie McEntire – backing vocals
 Louis Dean Nunley – backing vocals

 Ricky Page – backing vocals
 Bergen White – backing vocals
 Trish Williams – backing vocals
 Dennis Wilson – backing vocals

Musicians

 Jerry Carrigan – drums, percussion
 Ray Edenton – guitar
 Gordon Kennedy – guitar
 Jerry Kennedy – guitar 
 Mike Leech – bass
 Kenny Malone – drums, percussion
 Charlie McCoy – harmonica 

 Bob Moore – bass
 Weldon Myrick – steel guitar
 Hargus "Pig" Robbins – keyboards
 Buddy Spicher – fiddle 
 Bobby Thompson – banjo
 Pete Wade – guitar
 Chip Young – guitar

The Nashville String Machine
 Bergen White – string arrangements 
 George Binkley III, John Catchings, Marvin Chantry, Roy Christensen, Virginia Christensen, Carl Gorodetsky, Lennie Haight, Dennis Molchan, Chris Teal, Gary Vanosdale, Pamela Vanosdale and Stephanie Woolf – string performers

Production
 Ken Criblez – assistant engineer 
 Bob Heimall – art direction, design 
 Jim Houghton – photography
 Jerry Kennedy – producer 
 Steve Fralick – assistant engineer
 Brent King – engineer, mixing 
 Tim Kish – assistant engineer
 Rick McCollister – engineer, mixing
 Hank Williams – mastering

Charts

Album

Singles

References

1982 albums
Reba McEntire albums
Mercury Nashville albums
Albums produced by Jerry Kennedy